The AirLony Highlander is a Czech ultralight biplane that was designed and produced by AirLony of Štětí, introduced in 1998.

Design and development
The aircraft was designed to comply with the Fédération Aéronautique Internationale microlight rules. It features a biplane wing configuration, a two-seats-in-tandem open cockpit, fixed conventional landing gear and a single engine in tractor configuration.

The aircraft has a composite fuselage and wooden-framed  span wings with doped aircraft fabric covering. Engines in the  can be used. The Highlander was designed for, but never approved for aerobatics.

Specifications (Highlander)

References

1990s Czech and Czechoslovakian ultralight aircraft
Homebuilt aircraft
Highlander
Single-engined tractor aircraft
Biplanes